Patricio Mariano y Geronimo (17 March 1877 at Santa Cruz, Manila – 28 January 1935) was a Filipino nationalist, revolutionary, pundit, poet, playwright, dramatist, short story writer, novelist, journalist, violinist, and painter.  Mariano was a Katipunan member. Mariano was the son of Petronilo Mariano and Dionisia Geronimo.

Education
Mariano received his high school education at the Ateneo Municipal de Manila (now known as the Ateneo de Manila University) and at the Colegio de San Juan de Letran.  Mariano studied bookkeeping at the Escuela de Artes y Oficios.  Mariano received his Bachelor of Arts degree from the Liceo de Manila (now known as the Manila Central University).

Political career
Mariano was influenced by José Dizon, a Katipunan leader and typography and stereography shop owner, in joining the Katipunan.  Mariano worked for Dizon in the said printing shop.  Mariano joined the Filipino revolution in 1896.  However, Mariano decided not to fight till the end.  In 1898, Mariano became a public servant during the First Philippine Republic, wherein he acted as the right-hand man of Ambrosio Rianzares Bautista.  Bautista was the adviser to General Emilio Aguinaldo, the president of the First Philippine Republic. As a patriot, Mariano was one of the founders of the organization known as the Asociacion Pro Patria.

Literary career
At a time when the Tagalog Theater was beginning to evolve, Mariano pursued a career as a playwright by writing zarzuelas in the Tagalog language.  Mariano became a translator of literary works into the Tagalog language.  Apart from being a zarzuela author and translator, Mariano wrote poetry, short stories, dramas, and operettas.  Mariano focused on subjects of romance, social conditions, and the hopes of the Filipino people.  Mariano used symbolism in his works.  Mariano’s works as a playwright were performed at theaters such as the Zorrilla Theater, the Manila Grand Opera House, and the Rizal Theater in Tondo, Manila.  Mariano’s play, Sampaguita ("Jazmine"), was shown at the Zorilla Theater in 1901.  His one-act drama, Ang Pakakak ("The Tuba"), was presented at the Manila Grand Opera House on 7 July 1913, and his Ang Silanganan ("The East" or "The Levant"), another one-act drama, was performed at the Rizal Theater 30 December 1904.

Journalistic career
Armed with his experience in printing, Mariano utilized his skills at the Imprenta de Malolos, a printing press located at Barasoain in Malolos, Bulacan.  He became the manager of the Imprenta de Malolos.  As a journalist, Mariano wrote articles for periodicals such as the El Heraldo de la Revolucion (The Herald of the Revolution) and the Ang Kaibigan ng Bayan (The Friend of the Nation).  Mariano edited and wrote for other newspapers after the war.  The post-war periodicals Mariano had been active in included Los Obreros, Ang Paggawa, Katwiran, Lunas ng Bayan, El Renacimiento Filipino, La Vanguardia, and Taliba.

Translation career
As a translator, Mariano translated into the Tagalog language operas such as Lucia di Lammermoor and the third act of La traviata.  Mariano translated José Rizal's novels, namely Noli Me Tángere and El filibusterismo, from the Spanish originals.

Literary associations
As a playwright and a journalist, Mariano became a member of literary organizations during his lifetime.  Among the organizations Mariano became associated with included the Union de Artistas (Artists Union), the Union de Impresores (Printers' Union), the Buklod na Ginto (Gold Circle), the Aklatang Bayan (National Library), and the Lupong Tagapagpalaganap ng Akademya ng Wikang Tagalog (Board of Spreaders of the Academy of the Tagalog Language).

Death
Mariano succumbed to the effects and complications of a neck tumor and died in 1935.

Works

Plays
The following is an enumeration of the plays that Mariano authored:
Sampaguita ("Jazmine") (1901)
Anak ng Dagat ("Child of the Sea")
Ang Pakakak ("The Tuba") (a one-act drama) (1913)
Ang Silanganan ("The East" or "The Levant") (a one-act drama) (1904)

Novels
Juan Masili: Ang Pinuno ng Tulisan (1906)
Ang mga Anak Dalita (1911)
Ang Tala sa Panghulo (1913)

References

External links

 
 
 

1877 births
1935 deaths
Filipino dramatists and playwrights
Filipino poets
Filipino revolutionaries
Filipino translators
Filipino violinists
Filipino journalists
Katipunan members
Ateneo de Manila University alumni
Colegio de San Juan de Letran alumni
Bookkeepers
People from Santa Cruz, Manila
Writers from Manila
Filipino male short story writers
Filipino short story writers
Deaths from cancer in the Philippines
Filipino novelists
Tagalog-language writers
Filipino male poets